Pavel Kharitonov (born 25 July 1989 in Moscow, Russia) is a Russian snowboarder. He has competed at the 2014 Winter Olympics in Sochi.

References

1989 births
Snowboarders at the 2014 Winter Olympics
Living people
Olympic snowboarders of Russia
Russian male snowboarders
Sportspeople from Moscow
21st-century Russian people